Böyük Bəhmənli (also, Bëyuk Bekhmanli and Bëyuk-Bekhmenli) is a village and most populous municipality in the Fuzuli District of Azerbaijan.  It has a population of 6,171.

References 

Populated places in Fuzuli District